Mikhaylovka is a rural locality (a selo) and the administrative center of Mikhaylovsky Selsoviet of Mikhaylovsky District, Amur Oblast, Russia. The population was 689 as of 2018. There are 14 streets.

Geography 
Mikhaylovka is located on the left bank of the Zavitaya River, 47 km north of Poyarkovo (the district's administrative centre) by road. Novogeorgiyevka is the nearest rural locality.

References 

Rural localities in Mikhaylovsky District, Amur Oblast